Euan Byers (born 30 July 1974) is a Scottish curler.

Byers started playing curling in 1983. He plays in first position and is right-handed. Byers is a double world champion and triple European champion.

Teammates 
2010 Vancouver Olympic Games

David Murdoch, Skip

Ewan MacDonald, Third

Peter Smith, Second

Graeme Connal, Alternate

References

External links

1974 births
Living people
Scottish male curlers
British male curlers
Olympic curlers of Great Britain
Curlers at the 2006 Winter Olympics
Curlers at the 2010 Winter Olympics
World curling champions
European curling champions
Continental Cup of Curling participants
Sportspeople from Dumfries